Split payment (also split payment transaction) is the financial term for the act of splitting (dividing) a single and full amount of payment in two or more simultaneous transactions made by different payment methods and/or enable several individuals to jointly contribute part of the order total. For example: split payment of a $100 to a retail shop can be done when the customer pays $50 in cash and $50 by credit card. Same goes for $50 credit card for both parties.
Split payment is not the same as an installment purchase (a.k.a. hire purchase), where payments are done periodically with the same payment method.

History 
With the era of global trade, the financial possibilities grew and with them the challenges of collecting payments. The global markets made open and the consumer gained an increased buying power. In local and international transaction merchants are required to provide consumers with multiple payment options - this is not only a service required by consumers, it is a must-have for merchants in order to convert their products/services into cash. Statistically, the more payment options a merchant is able to offer, the likelihood of reaching more consumers increases.
The various payment methods available world-wide is overwhelming, nevertheless the payment methods available in a specific market are influenced by the local laws, legislations, culture and level of development. For merchants this creates a challenge of adapting their systems to accept a wide range of payment methods in order to enter a market with their offerings.

Split payment vs. coupon 
There are few models for split payment, some use the term for coupons or vouchers, when used to subsidies part of the full amount of payment.
While this approach can be used for simplifying the concept, it is yet not what is meant by split payment. The major difference between split payment and coupons is in that coupons are used to discount the full a new amount of payment - which is later paid in full by a single payment method in a single transaction.
A significant difference between a split payment implementation and a coupon implementation is the stage at which they appear during the checkout process. A coupon is implemented before the payment process, also referred to as the shopping cart. The split payment is implemented during the process of the checkout, usually one of the lasts steps.

Challenges

Business challenges 
The challenges for the business are all across the organization. It is mainly the accumulation and the reference of two separate transactions into a single order. What is in real-life trivial (the two payments come from the same hand) is for business processes a great challenge, and it is a bigger challenge when these transactions made on the Internet.
The business challenges shy both small and large merchants from offering split payment.

Technical challenges 
The IT systems dealing with financial transactions process those transaction as atomic unit. Financial systems complete one transaction from beginning to end; subsequent transaction are considered a totally new case. Combining the two transactions has impacts on costs, anti-fraud, reporting obligations (law & regulations) and might end up with only partial information stored in the merchant system.

Example: online implementation for split payment

Point of sale 
Many Point of Sale (POS) systems implement split payment.

References 

Sales